The United Kingdom of Great Britain and Northern Ireland competed at the 1998 Winter Paralympics held in Nagano, Japan. The team was known by it shortened name of Great Britain, for identification purposes. The team did not win any medals during these games.

Alpine skiing

Britain had 4 athletes competing in alpine skiing events.

Men

Women

Biathlon

Britain had 2 athletes competing in the biathlon events.

Men

Cross-country skiing

Britain had 2 athletes competing in the cross-country skiing events.

Men

Ice sledge hockey

Britain entered with a squad of 15 players for the men's ice sledge hockey competition. There was no female event.
The team finished in last place and scored no goals, but managed to pick up one point in a draw against 5th placed Japan.

Squad
 Matthew Broadbent
 Patrick Bailey
 Philip Hall
 Stephen Shortland
 Stuart Harley
 Timothy James
 Llyr Gwyndaf
 Karl Nicholson
 John Lambert
 Antony Booth
 Antony Neale
 Dave Hall
 Dean Cabanagh
 Gary Vaughan
 Ian Warner
Andrew white

Preliminary round

Round robin 
 0 – 7 
 0 – 6

Standings

Classification 5–7

Round robin 
 0 – 0 
 0 – 7

Standings

See also
Great Britain at the Paralympics
Great Britain at the 1998 Winter Olympics

References

External links
International Paralympic Committee official website

Nations at the 1998 Winter Paralympics
1998
Paralympics
Winter sports in the United Kingdom